Abyssothauma is a genus of sea snails, marine gastropod mollusks in the family Raphitomidae.

Species
Species within the genus Abyssothauma include:
 Abyssothauma psilarosis (Barnard, 1963)

References

External links
  Bouchet, P.; Kantor, Y. I.; Sysoev, A.; Puillandre, N. (2011). A new operational classification of the Conoidea (Gastropoda). Journal of Molluscan Studies. 77(3): 273-308

 
Raphitomidae
Monotypic gastropod genera